The 1991 Firestone Indy Lights Championship consisted of 12 races. Éric Bachelart won four races on his way to the championship. He was one of six different winners on the season.

Calendar

Race summaries

Long Beach race
Held April 14 at Long Beach, California Street Course. Éric Bachelart won the pole.

Top Five Results
 Éric Bachelart
 Robbie Buhl
 Robbie Groff
 Mark Smith
 Franck Fréon

Phoenix race
Held April 21 at Phoenix International Raceway. Mark Smith won the pole.

Top Five Results
 Robbie Groff
 Mark Smith
 Éric Bachelart
 Tommy Byrne
 Johnny O'Connell

Milwaukee race
Held June 2 at The Milwaukee Mile. John Marconi won the pole.

Top Five Results
 Robbie Groff
 Éric Bachelart
 Franck Fréon
 P. J. Jones
 John Marconi

Detroit race
Held June 16 at the Detroit street circuit. Éric Bachelart won the pole.

Top Five Results
 Éric Bachelart
 Franck Fréon
 Brian Till
 Robbie Buhl
 Robbie Groff

Portland race
Held June 23 at Portland International Raceway. P. J. Jones won the pole.

Top Five Results
 Éric Bachelart
 Franck Fréon
 Mark Smith
 Brian Till
 P. J. Jones

Cleveland race
Held July 7 at Burke Lakefront Airport. Mark Smith won the pole.

Top Five Results
 Mark Smith
 Brian Till
 Robbie Groff
 Johnny O'Connell
 Robbie Buhl

Meadowlands race
Held July 14 at the Meadowlands Sports Complex. Mark Smith won the pole.

Top Five Results
 Éric Bachelart
 P. J. Jones
 Robbie Buhl
 Robbie Groff
 Mark Smith

Toronto race
Held July 21 at Exhibition Place. Éric Bachelart won the pole.

Top Five Results
 P. J. Jones
 Robbie Buhl
 John Marconi
 Franck Fréon
 Mark Smith

Denver race
Held August 25 at the Denver, Colorado street circuit. Robbie Groff won the pole.

Top Five Results
 P. J. Jones
 Éric Bachelart
 Roberto Quintanilla
 Mark Smith
 Brian Till

Mid-Ohio race
Held September 15 at The Mid-Ohio Sports Car Course. Robbie Buhl won the pole. After a full-course caution to clean up the crash of Robbie Groff on lap 27 (of 34), the race went back to green on lap 30. Eric Bachelart and Robbie Buhl were running 1st-2nd. Going into turn one, Buhl got a jump on the restart, and dove inside. But Bachelart closed the door, and the two cars tangled. Brian Till, running third, slipped by to take the lead. The caution came out and the race finished under yellow. Hometown driver Brian Till won his first career Indy Lights race, with Mark Smith second.

Top Five Results
 Brian Till
 Mark Smith
 Franck Fréon
 P. J. Jones
 Roberto Quintanilla

Nazareth race
Held October 6 at Nazareth Speedway. Robbie Groff won the pole.

Top Five Results
 Robbie Buhl
 P. J. Jones
 Éric Bachelart
 Brian Till
 Roberto Quintanilla

Laguna Seca race
Held October 20 at Mazda Raceway Laguna Seca. Robbie Buhl won the pole.

Top Five Results
 Mark Smith
 Brian Till
 Éric Bachelart
 Mike Snow
 P. J. Jones

Final points standings

Driver

For every race the points were awarded: 20 points to the winner, 16 for runner-up, 14 for third place, 12 for fourth place, 10 for fifth place, 8 for sixth place, 6 seventh place, winding down to 1 points for 12th place. Additional points were awarded to the pole winner (1 point) and to the driver leading the most laps (1 point).

Note:

Race 7, 8 and 11 not all points were awarded (not enough competitors).

Complete Overview

R13=retired, but classified NS=did not start NQ=did not qualify (6)=place after practice, but grid position not held free DIS(10)=disqualified after finishing in tenth place

Indy Lights seasons
Indy Lights Season, 1991
Indy Lights